Trisha Yearwood is the debut studio album by American country music singer Trisha Yearwood, released on July 2, 1991, by MCA Records. It features her first Billboard Hot Country Songs hit "She's in Love with the Boy", which reached the top of the country charts in August 1991. Also included are follow-up hits "Like We Never Had a Broken Heart" at 4, "That's What I Like About You" at 8, and "The Woman Before Me" also at 4. The album itself reached the number 2 position on Billboards Top Country Albums chart, and was certified 2× Platinum for sales of two million copies.

Content
The track "Victim of the Game" was originally recorded by Yearwood's friend and future husband, Garth Brooks, for his 1990 album No Fences. "That's What I Like About You" was also recorded by James House on his 1990 album Hard Times for an Honest Man.

Track listing

Personnel
 Trisha Yearwood – lead vocals, backing vocals (1, 5)
 Matt Rollings – acoustic piano (1-7, 10)
 Al Kooper – organ (5)
 John Barlow Jarvis – organ (8), acoustic piano (9)
 Bobby All – acoustic guitar (1, 3, 5, 6, 10)
 Brent Mason – electric guitars (1-6, 8-10)
 Mac McAnally – acoustic guitar (2, 7-10), backing vocals (5)
 Pat Alger – acoustic guitar (4)
 Paul Franklin – steel guitar (1-4, 6, 8), lap steel guitar (9)
 Jerry Douglas – dobro (10)
 Dave Pomeroy – bass guitar (1-6, 8-10)
 Eddie Bayers – drums (1-6, 8-10)
 Rob Hajacos – fiddle (1, 3, 6, 9)
 Stuart Duncan – fiddle (4, 10)
 Kirk "Jelly Roll" Johnson – harmonica (8)
 Grace Bahng – cello (7)
 Kristin Wilkinson – viola (7)
 David Davidson – violin (7)
 Connie Heard – violin (7)
 Edgar Meyer – string arrangements (7)
 Garth Fundis – backing vocals (1, 5)
 Garth Brooks – backing vocals (4, 6)
 Vince Gill – backing vocals (10)

Production
 Garth Fundis – producer, mixing
 Gary Laney – recording 
 Dave Sinko – recording assistant 
 Denny Purcell – mastering
 Georgetown Masters (Nashville, Tennessee) – mastering location 
 Jim Kemp – creative direction 
 Katherine DeVault – art direction, design 
 Jim McGuire – photography 
 Robert Davis – hair stylist 
 June Arnold – make-up
 Sheri McCoy – wardrobe
 Ann Rice – wardrobe
 Profile – wardrobe

Charts

Weekly charts

Year-end charts

Singles

Certifications

References

1991 debut albums
MCA Records albums
Trisha Yearwood albums
Albums produced by Garth Fundis